Rohun Beven (born 21 September 1957) is a British former professional tennis player.

A left-handed player from Sussex, Beven was a Wimbledon junior quarter-finalist in 1975.

Beven qualified for the men's singles main draw of the 1979 Wimbledon Championships, where he lost his first round match in four sets to Paraguay's Francisco González. He featured in four further editions of the Wimbledon Championships in doubles main draws and also played doubles at the US Open.

References

External links
 
 

1957 births
Living people
British male tennis players
English male tennis players
Tennis people from East Sussex
People from Hartfield